Carboxypeptidase D is an enzyme that in humans is encoded by the CPD gene.

Function 

The metallocarboxypeptidase family of enzymes is divided into 2 subfamilies based on sequence similarities: the pancreatic carboxypeptidase-like and the regulatory B-type carboxypeptidase subfamilies. Carboxypeptidase D has been identified as a regulatory B-type carboxypeptidase. CPD is a homolog of duck gp180, a hepatitis B virus binding protein. Transcript variants utilizing alternative polyadenylation signals exist for this gene.

References

Further reading

External links